Cassava Sciences is an American pharmaceutical company based in Austin, Texas. The company was founded in 1998 by chief executive officer and president Remi Barbier as Pain Therapeutics, Inc., changing its name in 2019.

Cassava is developing simufilam (previously known as PTI-125 and sumifilam), an oral-tablet drug candidate for the treatment of Alzheimer's disease; simufilam is in phase III clinical trials as of 2022. Reuters reported on July 27, 2022, that the United States Department of Justice (DOJ) is investigating Cassava Sciences over research results related to the experimental drug. A citizen petition attempting to suspend the clinical trials was filed with the Food and Drug Administration (FDA), but the FDA said that the citizen petition "was not a proper avenue" to stop the trials in February 2022. Cassava Sciences has denied any wrongdoing and raised concerns about the motivations behind the FDA petition. The U.S. Securities and Exchange Commission (SEC), the U.S. National Institutes of Health (NIH), and City University of New York (CUNY) were also investigating allegations of manipulated data.

Cassava (as Pain Therapeutics) initially worked on three drugs: the pain drugs Oxytrex and Remoxy, and PTI-901, which aimed to treat irritable bowel syndrome. The company had no drug approved as of 2021, and no product revenues between 2013 and 2021; with 25 employees, the company's stock was the sixth-best performing in 2021 before falling after the FDA petition.

History

Founding 
Cassava Sciences was founded by Remi Barbier in May 1998 as Pain Therapeutics,  focusing on opioids and chronic pain. Barbier first heard of the research led by Stanley M. Crain at the Albert Einstein College of Medicine in New York City around 1993. Crain invited Barbier to his lab and explained the potential pharmaceutical and financial benefits. In 1998, Barbier started Pain Therapeutics, Inc. in South San Francisco, California, with an initial investment of  $1 million.

Name change 
Following the fourth FDA rejection of one of its experimental pain drugs, Remoxy, Cassava announced in August 2018 it would reorganize the company to focus on products for treating and diagnosing Alzheimer's. In 2019, the company changed its name to Cassava Sciences.

Corporate affairs

Leadership
Remi Barbier is Cassava's president, chief executive officer and chairman of the board.

Other officers as of August 2022 are:
 Nadav Friedmann, chief medical officer
 James W. Kupiec, chief clinical development officer
 Eric Schoen, chief financial officer

Senior vice presidents are Michael Zamloot (tech operations), George Thornton (technology), and Lindsay Burns (neuroscience). Burns is married to Barbier.

Hoau-Yan Wang, a professor at City University of New York (CUNY) is a consultant who is on Cassava's advisory board. He is a co-author, with Burns, of many journal papers. The Wall Street Journal (WSJ) stated in 2021 that, along with Cassava's officers, he can receive bonuses based on Cassava's market performance.

Patrick Keefe wrote in The New Yorker in January 2022 that Cassava's bonus plan provides for potential cash bonuses tied to "specific valuations [of the company's stock] for twenty consecutive days". He added that the "full incentive scheme could exceed two hundred million dollars, and it was not pegged to F.D.A. approval or to the success of the drug—just to the share price. This appeared to create an incentive for the company to pump its own stock." The WSJ stated that, under this plan, Barbier's bonus could reach $108 million.

According to Charles Piller, writing in Science, Barbier would not specify who were the company's 2022 scientific advisers.

Financial
The company had no product revenues between 2013 and 2021.

Cassava and its collaborators were awarded NIH grants of $20 million between 2015 and 2021.

The WSJ wrote that, due to the promise of its experimental Alzheimer's drug, Cassava Sciences stock became the sixth-best stock of 2021, driving the company's value to over $US5 billion, with the stock price reaching $125 per share.  Keefe noted that part of the increase in share price was driven by discussion and hype in online forums, making it a so-called meme stock.   The share price fell to $42 after a petition was filed with the FDA in August 2021, questioning the company's research.

Staffing 
As of November 2021, Cassava had 25 employees.

Research candidates
The company had no drug approved as of 2021.

FLNA hypothesis 
Filaman A (FLNA) is a protein that Cassava Sciences says becomes misshaped in people with Alzheimer's, leading to amyloid buildup in the brain contributing to the disease; Cassava journal papers, co-authored by Wang and Burns, suggest that the shape of FLNA in the brain can be restored.  A 2022 article in The New York Times stated that none of the Alzheimer's experts they spoke with knew of any support for the FLNA hypothesis; Lawrence Sterling Honig, professor of neurology at Columbia University Irving Medical Center, said: "But in fact, all the evidence seems to be from this [Wang's] lab." (Wang and Burns had earlier published together on FLNA's role in naloxone and opioid receptor signaling.)

Oxytrex, Remoxy and PTI-901
The company started with three drug candidates focused on opioid treatment: Oxytrex, Remoxy and PTI-901 (low-dose naltrexone for irritable bowel syndrome).

Oxytrex was a mixture of oxycodone, a generic opioid, combined with ultra-low-dose naltrexone that aimed to enhance analgesia while reducing opioid tolerance and withdrawal symptoms. The phase III trials had high drop out rates and failed.

Remoxy was a twice-daily gel form of oxycodone intended to be abuse-deterrent. It was repeatedly rejected by the FDA, culminating in the final rejection in 2018 after an FDA advisory meeting raised concerns about its potential risk of abuse. According to The New York Times, the FDA reprimanded Cassava Sciences for appearing to promote the unapproved drug. Barbier accused the FDA of "math errors, material mistakes and misrepresentations", which the agency denied.

Alzheimer's disease
In August 2020, the chemical name simufilam was assigned to the company's experimental drug, previously called PTI-125, which Cassava Sciences says can restore misshaped FLNA in the brain. Open-label studies had started in March 2020, and Cassava Sciences had reported in May 2020 that initial biomarker analysis of cerebrospinal fluid (CSF) samples from its phase IIb clinical trials of PTI-125 had failed, but reported in September 2020 that a new analysis by an "outside lab" showed improvements in biomarkers, adding that individuals with Alzheimer's also showed improvements in cognition with simufilam. It was later revealed that the outside lab was Wang's CUNY lab. In October 2021, larger trials were initiated; Cassava Sciences announced in December 2021 that the first phase III trial of simufilam would enroll about 750 participants, and the second 1,000. In the first quarter of 2022, 60 participants were enrolled; Stat stated that enrollment had slowed as of April 2022, as people were deterred from enlisting due to the prevailing controversies.

Allegations of research fraud 
Reuters reported on July 27, 2022, that a criminal investigation of Cassava Sciences had been started by the United States Department of Justice (DOJ) over research results related to simufilam. Two anonymous sources told Reuters that the investigation involved allegations that the company had "manipulated research results". A citizen petition attempting to suspend the clinical trials was filed with the Food and Drug Administration (FDA), but the FDA said that the citizen petition "was not a proper avenue" to stop the trials in February 2022. The request that FDA conduct an investigation fell out of the purview of the citizen petition process.

The Wall Street Journal stated in 2021 that the SEC, the NIH, and CUNY were also investigating allegations of manipulated data.

Cassava Sciences has denied any wrongdoing. Kate Moss, attorney, stated via email to Reuters that "Cassava Sciences ... has never been charged with a crime, and for good reason – Cassava Sciences has never engaged in criminal conduct." Piller summarized an email from Barbier as saying Cassava had "hired investigators to review its work, provided 'nearly 100,000 pages of documents to an alphabet soup of outside investigative agencies,' and asked CUNY to investigate ... 'there is no evidence of research misconduct'." On November 3, 2022, Cassava Sciences filed a defamation lawsuit in the U.S. District Court of the Southern District of New York against defendants Quintessential Capital Management LLC, Drs. David Bredt and Geoffrey Pitt and other short sellers. According to Bloomberg, the lawsuit alleges that defendants “orchestrated a smear campaign against Cassava that included more than 1,000 false and defamatory statements.”

Citizen petition to the FDA 
In August 2021, the FDA received a citizen petition–filed on behalf of two whistleblowers—alleging concerns about unreliable research and potential data manipulation in Cassava Science's preclinical research for the experimental drug. The petition was submitted by Jordan A. Thomas, who was then with the law firm Labaton Sucharow in New York City, and requested that the FDA halt the clinical trials until the issues could be resolved. According to Compliance Week, Thomas certified that the petition included "information known to the petitioner which are unfavorable to the petition". Cassava Sciences maintained that the claims about the research data were "outlandish" and said the FDA's process had been used abusively. Cassava's stock value dropped 55% after the petition was filed.

The petitioners who filed the FDA complaint were identified months later, in November 2021, as neuroscientist David S. Bredt, and cardiologist Geoffrey Pitt, a professor at Weill Cornell Medical College.  When the petition was filed, Bredt was an executive partner at a firm that raised investment capital for another biotechnology company working on Alzheimer's treatment. He had noticed Cassava Sciences when its stock price increased in 2021 following early positive trial results for simufilam. After examining the preclinical research papers, Bredt remarked that "they were making statements that were incompatible with biology and with pharmacology", and said that if the research was in fact legitimate, it should "win five Nobel Prizes". According to The Wall Street Journal, Cassava's initial report that the reanalysis of simufilam's effectiveness was done by "an outside lab"—later revealed to be the CUNY lab of Wang, "a longtime paid consultant to the company"—was not revealed to investors; the news had led to a doubling of the company's stock price. Bredt and Pitt suspected the re-analysis had been done by Wang, which was later confirmed by Barbier. Barbier responded that Wang was not an employee, so he considered his lab separate. Among other methodological concerns, the petitioners suspected irregularities in Western blot images in papers by Wang and Burns, and were concerned that the 2020 "reanalysis" of findings by Wang had not been disclosed in Cassava's filings and that individuals enrolled in trials would be taking a drug that might not be safe. They shorted shares of Cassava Sciences, expecting the price of its stock to drop once problems with the research were revealed. After the stock's precipitous drop caused by the FDA petition, it was revealed that they were short sellers; Compliance Week stated that Thomas had not revealed this information when he certified the citizen petition. Bloomberg News reported that the August selloff of Cassava shares earned short sellers $100 million, and Compliance Week stated that Bredt and Pitt "potentially ... made millions".

In July 2022, Piller identified Vanderbilt University neuroscientist Matthew Schrag as another whistleblower who examined images. Schrag reported to the NIH irregularities in 34 papers with authors linked to Cassava Sciences or its work, including Wang, Burns and Cassava advisor Steven Arnold, a Harvard University neurologist. Schrag was paid $18,000 by the petitioners' attorney for his hundreds of hours of analysis of the images. Piller contacted other experts who he said "generally agree" with Schrag's conclusions.

The FDA rejected the petition in February 2022 because the requests were "not the appropriate subject of a citizen petition", saying also that the rejection was not “a decision by the agency to take or refrain from taking any action”.

Other concerns raised 
A New York Times article stated in April 2022 that "many scientists have been deeply skeptical of the company's claims, asserting that Cassava's studies were flawed, its methods opaque and its results improbable". Robert Howard, professor of psychiatry at the University College London, remarked that the lack of placebo and small sample size meant research conclusions were "implausible" at the least. Elisabeth Bik, image-manipulation consultant, agreed to the citizen petition and alleged data errors and inconsistencies in the publications, identifying potential irregularities consistent with instances of copy and paste across different experiments. Thomas C. Südhof, Nobel laureate neuroscientist at Stanford University, also commented: "The overall conclusions with regard to Alzheimer's disease make no sense to me whatsoever... [The findings of Cassava Sciences] are not in the mainstream of the field, and to me they seem implausible and contrived."

Journal investigations 
Several journal papers involving Cassava work and collaborators have been re-examined by their publishers.

Following the public controversies, The Journal of Neuroscience reassessed the 2012 paper that described simufilam binding to FLNA. The journal published a correction along with the original images in December 2021 remarking that the "error does not affect the conclusions of the article". After further data concerns were brought to the attention of the journal, it issued an expression of concern stating that the issue was under investigation by CUNY, and that the journal would "await the outcome of that investigation before taking further action".

The journal Neurobiology of Aging found "no compelling evidence of data manipulation intended to misrepresent the results", but issued an expression of concern on a 2017 paper, saying they identified multiple errors. The journal issued a correction and indicated that its final decision awaited conclusions from the CUNY investigation.

The Journal of Prevention of Alzheimer’s Disease investigated a 2020 simufilam-related, also co-authored by Wang, and decided to take no action. Its editor reported finding "no convincing evidence of manipulation of data or intent to mislead".

PLOS One re-examined Wang's research papers in March 2020 and found problems with data integrity that were not resolved. Five of Wang's papers were retracted, two of which were co-authored with Burns that include the original papers on the discovery of FLNA binding as it relates to opioid receptor signaling. The FLNA retraction notices mention "vertical irregularities suggestive of splice lines" and that the "pixel patterns in background areas of blot images ... appear more similar than would be expected". The notices state: "The data and comments provided did not resolve the concerns about the integrity and reliability of data presented in this article."

A 2005 Neuroscience journal article on opioid tolerance was co-authored by Burns, Wang and others. According to Piller, Cassava has stated that the journal found no manipulation of images, but said the journal would respond to any new concerns based on the CUNY investigation.

Cassava advisors Wang and Arnold were co-authors on a highly-cited 2012 paper in the Journal of Clinical Investigation (JCI); Piller states that it forms a key part of Cassava's position that simufilam reduces resistance to insulin.  He writes that the paper relied on a method of analyzing how brain tissue "purportedly generates chemical signals"; Schrag found no indication the work, which he says "contradicts basic neurobiology", had been replicated. He sent two groups of images to JCI; the editor responded that they did not investigate further after examination of one of the groups did not corroborate Schrag's analysis. A group of four whistle-blowers also submitted concerns about the paper starting in August 2021. The four whistleblowers were independent of the two that filed the FDA petition, but they were also holding short positions on Cassava. JCI's investigation did not corroborate their concerns about the paper.

Notes

References

External links 
 Company website

1998 establishments in California
Alzheimer's disease research
American companies established in 1998
Companies based in Austin, Texas
Health care companies based in Texas
Medical scandals in the United States
Pharmaceutical companies established in 1998
Pharmaceutical companies of the United States